Scott Davies (born 5 August 1995) is a Welsh former racing cyclist, who rode professionally between 2013 and 2021 for the Team USN,  and  squads.

Biography
Born in Carmarthen, Davies attended Bro Myrddin Welsh Comprehensive School. Davies represented Wales at the Commonwealth Games in Glasgow, 2014.

He was named as a member of the  team for the 2016 season. In May 2019, he was named in the startlist for the Giro d'Italia. In October 2020, he was named in the startlist for the Vuelta a España.

Major results

2012
 1st  Time trial, National Junior Road Championships
2013
 1st  Overall Junior Tour of Wales
1st Stage 1 (ITT)
 2nd Overall Giro della Lunigiana
 7th Road race, UCI Junior Road World Championships
2014
 1st  Time trial, National Under-23 Road Championships
 10th Road race, Commonwealth Games
2015
 1st  Time trial, National Under-23 Road Championships
 6th Overall Flèche du Sud
1st Young rider classification
 10th Overall Herald Sun Tour
2016
 1st  Time trial, National Under-23 Road Championships
 2nd Overall Tour Alsace
 4th Duo Normand (with Jonathan Dibben)
 6th Overall Le Triptyque des Monts et Châteaux
 6th Grand Prix de la Ville de Lillers
 9th Overall Ronde de l'Isard
1st Stage 4
 9th Overall Tour of Croatia
2017
 1st  Time trial, National Under-23 Road Championships
 4th Overall Giro Ciclistico d'Italia
 5th Overall Tour Alsace
 10th Time trial, UCI Under-23 Road World Championships

Grand Tour general classification results timeline

References

External links
 
 

1995 births
Living people
Sportspeople from Carmarthen
British male cyclists
Welsh male cyclists
Cyclists at the 2014 Commonwealth Games
Commonwealth Games competitors for Wales